In music, 23 equal temperament, called 23-TET, 23-EDO ("Equal Division of the Octave"), or 23-ET, is the tempered scale derived by dividing the octave into 23 equal steps (equal frequency ratios). This system is the largest EDO that has an error of at least 20 cents for the 3rd (3:2), 5th (5:4), 7th (7:4), and 11th (11:8) harmonics. The lack of approximation to simple intervals makes the scale notable among those seeking to break free from conventional harmony rules.

History and use
23-EDO was advocated by ethnomusicologist Erich von Hornbostel in the 1920s, as the result of "a cycle of 'blown' (compressed) fifths" of about 678 cents that may have resulted from "overblowing" a bamboo pipe. Today, dozens of songs have been composed in this system.

Notation
There are two ways to notate the 23-tone system with the traditional letter names and system of sharps and flats, called melodic notation and harmonic notation.

Harmonic notation preserves harmonic structures and interval arithmetic, but sharp and flat have reversed meanings. Because it preserves harmonic structures, 12-EDO music can be reinterpreted as 23-EDO harmonic notation, so it's also called conversion notation.

An example of these harmonic structures is the Circle of Fifths below (shown in 12-EDO, harmonic notation, and melodic notation.)

Melodic notation preserves the meaning of sharp and flat, but harmonic structures and interval arithmetic no longer work.

Interval size

Scale diagram

Modes

See also
Musical temperament
Equal temperament

References

Equal temperaments
Microtonality